Pradeep Gandhi (born 26 December 1964) is an Indian politician and a member of the Bharatiya Janata Party (BJP) political party.

He was a member of the 14th Lok Sabha of India, representing the Rajnandgaon constituency of Chhattisgarh. He was member of Chhattisgarh Legislative Assembly in 2004.

He is married to Mrs Keerti Gandhi and has two sons and one daughter.

Expulsion

In the sting Operation Duryodhana by the Noida based media firm Cobrapost, aired 12 December 2005 on the Indian Hindi news TV Channel Aaj Tak, Gandhi was caught on video accepting bribes of Rs. 55,000 for fielding fictitious questions in parliament.

On 23 December 2005 a Special Committee of the Lok Sabha found him guilty of contempt of the House and following a motion calling for the expulsion of all 11 MPs caught in the sting,  he was expelled from Parliament.

References

1964 births
People from Rajnandgaon
Living people
India MPs 2004–2009
Chhattisgarh MLAs 2003–2008
Lok Sabha members from Chhattisgarh
People expelled from public office
Bharatiya Janata Party politicians from Chhattisgarh